Mateas Delić (born 17 June 1988) is a Croatian professional footballer who plays as a forward for Koprivnica.

Club career
On 16 January 2017, Delić signed with Bulgarian First League side Beroe Stara Zagora but his contract was terminated by mutual consent in May.

Club career statistics

External links
Mateas Delić profile at Nogometni Magazin 
Mateas Delić profile at Sportnet.hr

References

1988 births
Living people
People from Sanski Most
Association football forwards
Croatian footballers
Croatia youth international footballers
Croatia under-21 international footballers
NK Slaven Belupo players
NK Koprivnica players
Gangwon FC players
PFC Beroe Stara Zagora players
A.S. Bisceglie Calcio 1913 players
Croatian Football League players
K League 1 players
First Professional Football League (Bulgaria) players
Serie C players
Croatian expatriate footballers
Expatriate footballers in South Korea
Expatriate footballers in Bulgaria
Expatriate footballers in Italy
Croatian expatriate sportspeople in South Korea
Croatian expatriate sportspeople in Bulgaria
Croatian expatriate sportspeople in Italy